Răzoare may refer to several places in Romania:

 Răzoare, a neighborhood in Bucharest
 Răzoare, a village in Frata Commune, Cluj County
 Răzoare, a village in the town of Târgu Lăpuş, Maramureș County
 Răzoare, a village in Miheșu de Câmpie Commune, Mureș County